= Cis-Gomti area =

Cis-Gomti area is a sub-city in the Lucknow metropolitan area, in the state of Uttar Pradesh, India. The residential settlements in the Cis-Gomti area are: Hazratganj, Aminaabad, Husainganj, Lal Bagh, Golabganj, Wazirganj, Rajendra Nagar, Malviya Nagar, Sarojini Nagar, Aishbagh, Rajajipuram, Chowk, and Saadatganj, Buddheswar.

In 2024, a water pipe burst, causing many homes in the area to lose running water.
